Nohelia Linares González (born 7 May 1968) is a Mexican politician from the National Action Party. She has served as Deputy of the LVI and LVIII Legislatures of the Mexican Congress representing Michoacán.

References

1968 births
Living people
Politicians from Michoacán
Women members of the Chamber of Deputies (Mexico)
National Action Party (Mexico) politicians
20th-century Mexican politicians
20th-century Mexican women politicians
21st-century Mexican politicians
21st-century Mexican women politicians
Deputies of the LVIII Legislature of Mexico
Members of the Chamber of Deputies (Mexico) for Michoacán